The term drumhead refers to a type of removable sign that was prevalent on North American railroads of the first half of the 20th century. The sign was mounted at the rear of named passenger trains, and consisted of a box with internal illumination that shone through a tinted panel bearing the logo of the railroad or specific train. Since the box and the sign were usually circular in shape and resembled small drums, they came to be known as drumheads.

Railroad drumheads were removable so that they could be mounted on different passenger cars (usually on the rear of observations), as needed for specific trains.

See also 
 Headboard

References 

Passenger rail transport in Canada
Passenger rail transportation in the United States
Signage